The men's 400 metres hurdles event at the 2009 Summer Universiade was held on 8–10 July.

Medalists

Results

Heats
Qualification: First 3 of each heat (Q) and the next 4 fastest (q) qualified for the semifinals.

Semifinals
Qualification: First 3 of each semifinal (Q) and the next 2 fastest (q) qualified for the final.

Final

References
Results (archived)

400
2009